Acrocercops leucophaea is a moth of the family Gracillariidae, known from Uttarakhand and Assam, India and Nepal. It was described by Edward Meyrick in 1919. The hostplants for the species include Lyonia ovalifolia and Engelhardia spicata.

References

leucophaea
Moths of Asia
Moths described in 1919